Jim Hester (December 13, 1944 – November 14, 2002) was an American football tight end. He played for the New Orleans Saints from 1967 to 1969 and for the Chicago Bears in 1970.

References

1944 births
2002 deaths
American football tight ends
North Dakota Fighting Hawks football players
New Orleans Saints players
Chicago Bears players